Juhan Kaarlimäe (also Johann Karlsberg; 21 November 1901 Vana-Vändra Parish (now Põhja-Pärnumaa Parish), Kreis Pernau – 5 February 1977 Raikküla Selsoviet, Rapla District) was an Estonian politician. He was a member of V Riigikogu.

References

1901 births
1977 deaths
People from Põhja-Pärnumaa Parish
People from Kreis Pernau
Farmers' Assemblies politicians
Patriotic League (Estonia) politicians
Members of the Riigikogu, 1932–1934
Members of the Estonian National Assembly
Members of the Riigivolikogu
Hugo Treffner Gymnasium alumni
University of Tartu alumni
Estonian military personnel of the Estonian War of Independence
Recipients of the Order of the White Star, 4th Class
Gulag detainees